Kutlab is a rural locality (a selo) in Tlyaratinsky District, Republic of Dagestan, Russia. The population was 1,011 as of 2010.

Geography 
Kutlab is located 6 km southwest of Tlyarata (the district's administrative centre) by road. Tlyarata is the nearest rural locality.

References 

Rural localities in Tlyaratinsky District